Naresh Mhaske is a Shiv Sena politician from Thane district, Maharashtra. He is the current Mayor of Thane Municipal Corporation.

Positions held
 2012: Elected as corporator in Thane Municipal Corporation 
 2017: Re-elected as corporator in Thane Municipal Corporation 
 2017: Elected as leader of house in Thane Municipal Corporation
 2019: Elected as Mayor of Thane Municipal Corporation

References

External links
  Shivsena Home Page 
 ठाणे महानगरपालिका पदाधिकारी

Living people
Mayors of Thane
Shiv Sena politicians
People from Thane district
Marathi politicians
Maharashtra politicians
Year of birth missing (living people)